Xinshi is a town under the administration of Pingshan County in southeastern Sichuan province, China, located about  west of the county seat on the southern (right) bank of the Min River, across which is Yunnan. , it has two residential communities and 27 villages under its administration.

References

Township-level divisions of Sichuan